The 1894 Grand National was the 56th renewal of the Grand National horse race that took place at Aintree near Liverpool, England, on 30 March 1894.

Finishing Order

Non-finishers

References

 1894
Grand National
Grand National
19th century in Lancashire